Sammy Maphoko Seabi (born 21 November 1994) is a South African soccer player who plays as a midfielder for South African Premier Division side Sekhukhune United, on loan from Mamelodi Sundowns.

Career
Seabi was born in Polokwane and started his career at Polokwane City, before signing for Mamelodi Sundowns in August 2019. He joined Moroka Swallows on loan in October 2020. In the summer of 2021, he joined Chippa United on loan for the 2021–22 season.

Honours
Mamelodi Sundowns
South African Premier Division: 2019–20
Nedbank Cup: 2019–20
Telkom Knockout: 2019
Source:

References

Living people
1994 births
South African soccer players
People from Polokwane
Sportspeople from Limpopo
Association football midfielders
Polokwane City F.C. players
Mamelodi Sundowns F.C. players
Moroka Swallows F.C. players
Chippa United F.C. players
Sekhukhune United F.C. players
South African Premier Division players